Donats Mountain is a mountain located in the Catskill Mountains of New York south of Cobleskill. Mount Shank is located northwest, Warnerville Hill is located south-southeast, and Petersburg Mountain is located southeast of Donats Mountain.

References

Mountains of New York (state)
Mountains of Schoharie County, New York